Yanoama: The Story of Helena Valero, a Girl Kidnapped by Amazonian Indians (original Italian title Yanoáma: dal racconto di una donna rapita dagli Indi) is a biography of Helena Valero, a white woman who was captured in the 1930s as a girl by the Kohorochiwetari, a tribe of the Yanomami indigenous people, living in the Amazon rainforest on the border between Venezuela and Brazil. She lived with the Yanomami for about two decades (variously given as 20, 22, or 24 years). While living with the Yanoama, Valero married twice and gave birth to four children (three sons and one daughter). She escaped in 1956 to what she refers to as "the white man" in the country of her birth. After rejection by her family and living in poverty at a mission, Valero chose to return to life with the Yanomami.

Valero recounted her life's story to Italian biologist and anthropologist Ettore Biocca, who published the account in 1965. In the book, Valero tells of life in the forest: hunter-gatherer living in the Amazon; the customs, lore, rituals, and observances of Yanomami culture; and the relationships and wars between individuals, families, and tribes. The book includes detailed information about life in several Yanomami tribes.

Its authenticity is fully accepted by anthropologists.

Compilation 
Ettore Biocca, an Italian anthropologist, compiled information about Valero's experience among the Yanoama from tape recordings he made of Valero between 1962 and 1963. Biocca used a three-pronged method: asking the same questions, listening to the same stories several times, and comparing each story to the others. He found no inconsistency.

Biocca also published other volumes of Valero's accounts, which include a great deal of information on the culture of the Yanoama.

Plot summary

Part One (from kidnapping to living with the Namoeteri)
Helena is a girl of Spanish descent ("white girl" in the book), who lives next to a river near the Amazon forest with her family of subsistence farmers. When she is a preadolescent (between 11 and 13 years old), the family is attacked by native warriors ("Indians" in the book). She is wounded and captured by one of the Yanoama tribes, and they take her to live with them.

She lives with a tribe called the Shamateri. After accidentally giving poisonous toad eggs to a child, the father wants to kill Helena so she escapes into the forest and subsequently lives there for seven months.

Eventually, she reaches a tribe called the Namoeteri. At first she is not well received. She unintentionally makes the mistake of insulting them, and she believes that her life is in danger. She flees to the forest once again, and is later caught.

Part Two (life with Fusiwe, headman of the Namoeteri)
Fusiwe, the man who catches Helena, is the headman of the Namoeteri tribe. In time, she falls in love with him and she eventually becomes his third (out of four) and second youngest wife. Fusiwe tells her many stories and myths from the Yanoama tradition. Helena also narrates incidents from the war, intrigues, betrayals, and political conflicts of the Yanoama.  After the birth of two sons, Fusiwe is killed by an opposing tribe.

Part Three (from Akawe to "the white man")
After Fusiwe's death, the opposing tribe plots to kill her sons out of fear that they would grow up and avenge their father's death. Helena takes them to a distant tribe that was uninvolved with the concerns of the Namoeteri tribe.

After some time she marries again, this time to a man named Akawe. She bears him two children: a boy and a girl. There her life is not consistent, as she and Akawe often move between villages. Akawe also treats her rather poorly.

Her life is under threat again when the tribe that had killed Fusiwe relocates to live near her. That, combined with her husband's insanity, persuades her to move back among white men.

The last chapter is entitled "The wicked world of the white man." Helena bitterly recounts how nobody takes care of her among the whites, and that she often goes hungry. After a while, Helena decides to return to live with the Yanomami.

References

Bibliography
 
 

1965 non-fiction books
Biographies (books)
Yanomami